Patrick Barnewall may refer to:

Patrick Barnewall (judge) ( 1500–1552), Solicitor General for Ireland
Patrick Barnewall (died 1622), grandson of the above
Sir Patrick Barnewall, 1st Baronet (died 1624), of the Barnewall baronets

See also
Barnewall (disambiguation)